Phineas Pemberton House, also known as the Bolton Mansion, is a historic home located in Bristol Township, Levittown, Bucks County, Pennsylvania. It consists of four connected structures built between 1687 and 1790.

History

Pemberton family
The Pembertons were of English lineage. The direct paternal ancestor Phineas Pemberton and his family from Lancashire traveled aboard the ship Submission about 1682 from Liverpool to the Province of Maryland, and eventually settled in Bucks County, Pennsylvania. There he built a house in 1687 and had served as William Penn's chief administrator.

Building
The original house was built in 1687, and is now the rear wing. It is a two-story, fieldstone structure with brick chimneys. The main section was built in 1790, and is a two-story, four-bay, fieldstone structure in the Georgian style. It has a gambrel roof.  The house is owned and maintained by the Friends of Bolton Mansion.  It is open as a historic house museum.

It was added to the National Register of Historic Places in 1971.

References

External links
Friends of Bolton Mansion website

Historic house museums in Pennsylvania
Houses on the National Register of Historic Places in Pennsylvania
Georgian architecture in Pennsylvania
Houses completed in 1790
Houses in Bucks County, Pennsylvania
National Register of Historic Places in Bucks County, Pennsylvania